Amako, or Korak, is a Papuan language of Papua New Guinea. It is spoken in Korak, Almami Rural LLG, Madang Province.

References

Kowan languages
Languages of Madang Province